Fraxin is a glucoside of fraxetin.

Bibliography 

Coumarins
Phenol glucosides